Aleman may refer to:

Places
Aleman, Iran, a village in Gilan Province
Aleman, New Mexico a locale along the Jornada del Muerto in Sierra County, New Mexico

Other uses
Aleman (surname)
A member of the Alamanni, a German tribe

See also
Alemann, a German surname